Louise Porter (September 19, 1917 – August 24, 1980) was an American politician who served for five years in the Kansas State Senate. A homemaker and rancher, she took office in 1965, representing the 4th district; in 1969, she switched to representing the 12th district and resigned in 1970, when she was replaced by John Crofoot.

References

Republican Party Kansas state senators
20th-century American politicians
Women state legislators in Kansas
People from Lyon County, Kansas
1917 births
1980 deaths
20th-century American women politicians